Sebastian Kolasiński (born 16 February 1975) is a Polish former competitive ice dancer. With partner Sylwia Nowak, he is the 1998 Skate Canada International bronze medalist, 1999 Cup of Russia bronze medalist, 1994 World Junior champion, and a nine-time Polish national champion.

Personal life 
Kolasiński was born on 16 February 1975 in Łódź, Poland. He has a daughter, Jagoda (born in 2002), with his ex-wife, Jagna Marczułajtis, an Olympic snowboarder.

Career 
Early in his career, Kolasiński had a brief partnership with Agnieszka Domańska. In 1991, coaches paired him with Sylwia Nowak, with whom he competed for the rest of his career. They won silver at the 1993 World Junior Championships and then gold in 1994.

As seniors, Nowak/Kolasiński won gold medals at the Nebelhorn Trophy, Finlandia Trophy, and Karl Schäfer Memorial and bronze medals at two Grand Prix competitions, Skate Canada International and Cup of Russia. They placed as high as 9th at the World Championships and competed at two Olympics, in 1998 and 2002. The two retired from competitive skating after the 2002–03 season. They occasionally skate at special performances.

Kolasiński also works as a coach and choreographer. One of his former students is Ilona Senderek.

Programs 
(with Nowak)

Results
GP: Champions Series/Grand Prix

(with Nowak)

References

External links
 

1975 births
Living people
Polish male ice dancers
Figure skaters at the 1998 Winter Olympics
Figure skaters at the 2002 Winter Olympics
Olympic figure skaters of Poland
Sportspeople from Łódź
World Junior Figure Skating Championships medalists
Universiade medalists in figure skating
Universiade silver medalists for Poland
Competitors at the 2001 Winter Universiade